Clausel may refer to:

People
 Bertrand Clausel

Other
 Clausel, a Luxembourgish beer brand founded in 2007